Everybody Knows the Monkey is the tenth studio album released by The Saints.

Track listing 
All tracks composed by Chris Bailey; except where indicated
"What Do You Want" - 2:56
"Easy Money" - 3:09
"Working Overtime" - 4:11
"Fall of an Empire" - 4:27
"Mustard" - 3:16
"Vaguely Jesus" - 3:17
"What Are You Waiting For" (Martin Bjerregaard) - 3:28
"Everything Turns Sour" - 4:13
"Playboy of the Western World" - 3:12
"Come Back and Visit" (Michael Bayliss) - 4:13
"S+M+M's" - 2:52
"Glorious Wonder" - 5:42

Personnel
 Chris Bailey - vocals, guitar
 Andy Faulkner - guitar
 Michael Bayliss - bass
 Martin Bjerregaard - drums
with:
 Johan Stentorp - keyboard contributions

References

The Saints (Australian band) albums
1998 albums